The Tupolev ANT-14 Pravda was a Soviet aircraft, which served as the flagship of the Soviet propaganda squadron. It has been credited as Russia's first all-metal aircraft, with a corrosion-resistant-steel structure.

The ANT-14 was a larger version of the ANT-9, with a 40.4 m wingspan, compared to the 23.8 m span of the ANT-9. Powered by five 358 kW (480 hp) Gnome-Rhône Jupiter 9AKX radial engines, it was capable of carrying a crew of three, as well as 36 passengers, at a maximum speed of 236 km/h (147 mph). However its cruise speed was only 195 km/h (121 mph). Empty weight was 10,650 kg (23,480 lb) and maximum takeoff weight was 17,146 kg (37,800 lb). The ANT-14 had a range of 900 km (559 mi), and an operational ceiling of 4,220 m (13,845 ft). It had a non-retractable tailwheel undercarriage whose main gear consisted of dual (fore-aft) wheels.

Operational history
The ANT-14 was tested by Aeroflot in 1932. While these tests revealed no problems with the aircraft, it was far larger than any other aircraft in its fleet, and it had no requirement for an aircraft with a 36-passenger capacity, so no production followed.

On 17 March 1933, the Soviet Union set up an aerial propaganda squadron, named after Maxim Gorky, and the ANT-14 was assigned to it as its flagship, being named Pravda (Truth) after the Soviet newspaper and was used mainly for sightseeing flights over Moscow, but did carry out occasional tourist flights to Kharkov and Leningrad (now Saint Petersburg), while it visited Bucharest in 1935 to help celebrate a festival being held there at the time. The ANT-14 carried over 40,000 passengers before being grounded in 1941.

Operators

Specifications

See also

References

Further reading

Five-engined tractor aircraft
1930s Soviet airliners
1930s Soviet special-purpose aircraft
ANT-14
High-wing aircraft
Aircraft first flown in 1931